A linguist in the academic sense is a person who studies natural language (an academic discipline known as linguistics). Ambiguously, the word is sometimes also used to refer to a polyglot (one who knows several languages), or a grammarian (a scholar of grammar), but these two uses of the word are distinct (and one does not have to be a polyglot in order to be an academic linguist). The following is a list of notable linguists in the academic sense.



A
 Abbott, Barbara (United States), pragmatics, semantics
 Abel, Carl (Germany), comparative lexicography
 Abdul Haq, Maulvi (India, 1870–1961), Urdu language
 Abrams, Lise (United States), psycholinguistics
 Abramson, Arthur S. (United States, 1925–2017), phonetics
 Adamou, Evangelia, language contact
 Adams, Douglas Q. (United States), English language, comparative linguistics, Tocharian language
 Adler, George J. (Germany/United States, 1821–1868), lexicography, German language, English language
 Aijmer, Karin (Sweden), pragmatics, semantics
 Aikhenvald, Alexandra Yurievna (Russia, 1957–), syntax, typology, Amazonian languages, Papuan languages, Hebrew language, Russian language
 Aitken, Adam Jack (UK, 1921–1998), lexicography
 Ajduković, Jovan (Serbia, 1968–), Slavic languages, sociolinguistics, contact linguistics, Russian language, Serbian language
 Albright, William Foxwell (United States, 1891–1971), Semitic languages
 Alexiadou, Artemis (1969–), Greek language, syntax
 Al-Khalil ibn Ahmad al-Farahidi (Oman, 718–786 CE)
 Al-Kisa'i (Iraq)
 Allan, Keith (Australia), semantics
 Allen, Shanley, psycholinguistics, Inuktitut
 Alleyne, Mervyn Coleridge (Trinidad and Tobago/Jamaica, 1933–2016), creole language
 Ameka, Felix (Ghana, Australia, Netherlands), pragmatics, semantics
 Amerias (Greece), Ancient Macedonian language, lexicography
 Anagnostopoulou, Elena (1967–), Greek language, theoretical linguistics
 Anderson, Gregory D.S. (United States), Munda languages
 Anderson, Stephen (United States, 1943–), morphology and history of linguistics
 Aoun, Joseph (Lebanon/United States), Arabic language, syntax
 Ariel, Mira (Israel), Accessibility Theory, pragmatics
 Arisaka Hideyo (Japan, 1908–1952), Japanese language
 Aristar, Anthony (South Africa/United States, 1948–), linguistic infrastructure
 Armstrong, Lilias (UK, 1882–1937), phonetics
 Aronoff, Mark (Canada, 1949–), morphology
 Ascoli, Graziadio Isaia (Italy, 1829–1907), substrata, Ladin language
 Austin, John Langshaw (UK, 1911–1960), philosophy of language, speech act
 Awobuluyi, Oladele (Nigeria, 1937–), African languages
 Ayres-Bennett, Wendy (UK), history of French and history of linguistic thought
 Azad, Humayun (Bangladesh, 1947–2004), Bengali language
 Al-Harbi, Abdul Aziz (Saudi Arabia)
 Al-Mubarrad (Basra)

B
 Babiniotis, Georgios (Greece, 1939–), Greek language
 Babych, Nadiya (Ukraine, 1943–2021), phraseology
 Bach, Emmon (United States, 1929–2014), syntax, phonology, Haisla language
 Baker, Mark (United States), Mohawk language, generative grammar
 Bally, Charles (Switzerland, 1865–1947), French language, phraseology
 Bardovi-Harlig, Kathleen (United States, 1954–), second-language acquisition, tense and aspect, pragmatics
 Bar-Hillel, Yehoshua (Israel, 1915–1975), machine translation, categorial grammar
 Barker, (Philip) Muhammad Abd-al-Rahman (United States, 1930–2012), Urdu language, Indian languages
 Barlow, Robert Hayward (United States, 1918–1951), Nahuatl language
 Barnhart, David K. (United States, 1941–), lexicography, English language
 Barnhart, Robert (United States, 1933–2007), lexicography, English language
 Barsky, Robert (United States), discourse analysis
 Barthes, Roland (France, 1915–1980)
 Bartlett, John Russell (United States, 1805–1886)
 Basbøll, Hans (Denmark, 1943–), phonology, Danish
 Baudouin de Courtenay, Jan Niecisław (Poland, 1845–1929), phonology, Polish language
 Bauer, Robert Stuart (United States, 1946), syntax, phonology, Sino-Tibetan languages (especially Cantonese) 
 Baugh, John (United States, 1949–), sociolinguistics, linguistic profiling, forensic linguistics 
 Beckman, Mary E. (United States), phonetics, phonology
 Beckwith, Christopher (United States, 1945–), Asian languages, Tibetan language
 Beddor, Patrice (United States), Phonetics, speech perception
Bedirxan , Celadet Alî (Syria , 1893-1951) Kurdish language
 Beeken, Jeannine (Belgium, 1961–), lexicography, syntax, Dutch language
 Bello, Andrés (Venezuela), Spanish language, philology
 Bellugi, Ursula (United States), sign language, neurolinguistics
 Ben-Yehuda, Eliezer (Israel), lexicography, Revival of the Hebrew language
 Bender, M. Lionel (United States), African languages
 Benedict, Paul K. (United States), Sino-Tibetan languages, Tai–Kadai languages, historical linguistics
 Benveniste, Émile (France, 1902–1976)
 Berez-Kroeker, Andrea L. (United States, 1972–), language documentation
 Berlitz, Charles Frambach (United States, 1914–2003), language acquisition
 Berlitz, Maximilian Delphinius (United States, 1852–1921), language acquisition
 Bhartrihari (India, 450–510), Sanskrit
 Bickel, Balthasar (Switzerland, 1965–), language typology, Kiranti languages
 Bickerton, Derek (United States, 1926–2018), creole languages, origin of language
 Bleek, Wilhelm Heinrich Immanuel (Germany, 1827–1875), languages of Africa
 Bloch, Bernard (United States, 1907–1965), Japanese language
 Bloch, Jules (France, 1880–1953), languages of India
 Bloomfield, Leonard (United States, 1887–1949), structural linguistics
 Blust, Robert (United States), Austronesian languages
 Boas, Franz (United States, 1858–1942), indigenous languages of the Americas
 Bœck, Égide de (Belgium, Belgish Congo, 1875–1944), Bangala language, Lingala
 Boersma, Paul (Netherlands, 1959–), phonetics
 Boiagi, Mihail G. (Habsburg monarchy, 1780–uncertain), Aromanian grammar
 Bohn, Ocke-Schwen (Germany, 1953–), phonetics, second-language acquisition
 Bolinger, Dwight Le Merton (United States, 1907–1992), semantics, Spanish language
 Bomhard, Allan R. (United States, 1943–), Nostratic languages, historical linguistics
 Bopp, Franz (Germany, 1791–1867), Indo-European languages, comparative linguistics
 Boyd, Julian Charles (United States, 1931–2005), English language
 Bowerman, Melissa, psycholinguistics, language acquisition
 Bowern, Claire, historical linguistics
 Bresnan, Joan (United States, 1945–), syntax
 Bright, William (United States, 1928–2006), Native American languages, South Asian languages
 Brinton, Laurel J. (Canada), grammaticalization, discourse markers
 Brody, Michael (Hungary, 1954–), syntax
 Browman, Catherine (United States, 1945–2008), phonetics, phonology
 Brugmann, Karl (Germany, 1849–1919), Indo-European languages, Sanskrit, comparative linguistics
 Bucholtz, Mary (United States), sociolinguistics
 Burgess, Anthony (UK, 1917–1993), English language, phonetics
 Burling, Robbins (United States, 1926–2021), languages of India
 Burridge, Kate (Australia), Germanic languages
 Butt, Miriam (Germany, 1966–), syntax, South Asian languages
 Butzkamm, Wolfgang (Germany, 1938–), applied linguistics, English language
 Byington, Cyrus (United States, 1793–1868), translated English religious text into Choctaw language
 Badawi, El-Said

C
 Campbell, Lyle (United States, 1942–), Native American languages
 Canger, Una (Denmark, 1938–), Mesoamerican languages
 Canonge, Elliott D. (United States), Comanche, Inuit
 Capell, Arthur (Australia, 1902–1986), Australian languages, Austronesian languages, Papuan languages
 Cardona, George (United States), Indo-European studies
 Carnap, Rudolf (Germany, 1891–1970), syntax, constructed languages
 Carnie, Andrew (Canada, 1969–), syntax
 Caro Baroja, Julio (1914–1995)
 Caro, Miguel A. (Colombia, 1843–1909), Spanish language, Colombian Spanish
 Carpenter, William Henry (United States, 1853–1936), Icelandic language
 Cart, Théophile (France, 1855–1931), Esperanto
 Carter, Hazel (UK, 1928–2016), Bantu languages
 Chadwick, John (UK, 1920–1998), Linear B
 Chafik, Mohamed (Morocco, 1926–), writer and specialist in the Berber or Amazigh languages, dialects, and literature
 Chafe, Wallace (United States, 1927–2019), cognitive linguistics, semantics
 Chao Yuen Ren (PR China, 1892–1982), Chinese language
 Chakrabarti, Byomkes (India, 1923–1981), Santali language, Bengali language, comparative linguistics
 Champollion, Jean-François (France, 1790–1832), Egyptian hieroglyphs
 Chambers, Jack (Canada, 1938–), sociolinguistics
 Chatterji, Suniti Kumar (India, 1890–1977), Bengali language
 Choijinzhab (PR China, 1931–), Mongolian language
 Chomsky, Noam (United States, 1928–), syntax, universal grammar
 Choueiri, Lina (Lebanon), syntax, Lebanese Arabic
 Chyet, Michael L. (United States, 1957–), Kurdish language
 Clark, Eve V. (UK/United States, 1942–), psycholinguistics, language acquisition
 Clyne, Michael George (Australia), Germanic languages
 Cohen, Paul S. (United States), 1942–), phonology, etymology
 Cohen, Maurice Abraham (Australia), 1851–1923), Urdu
 Collitz, Hermann (Germany/United States, 1855–1935), historical linguistics
 Comrie, Bernard (UK, 1947–), typology
 Cook, Guy (UK, 1951–), applied linguistics
 Cook, Vivian (UK, 1940–2021), applied linguistics
 Corder, Stephen Pit (UK, 1918–1990), applied linguistics
 Coşeriu, Eugen (Romania/Germany, 1921–2002), Romance languages
 Couper-Kuhlen, Elizabeth (1943–), interactional linguistics
 Cowgill, Warren (United States, 1929–1985), Indo-European studies
 Cowper, Elizabeth (Canada), syntax
 Creissels, Denis (France), syntax, phonology, Niger–Congo languages, Nakh-Daghestanian languages
 Croft, William (United States, 1956–), syntax, cognitive linguistics
 Crystal, David (UK, 1941–), English language, language death, applied linguistics
 Cuervo, Rufino José (Colombia, 1844–1911), Spanish language, Colombian Spanish
 Culicover, Peter W. (United States), syntax, language change
 Culioli, Antoine (France, 1924–2018), general linguistics
 Cumakunova, Gülzura (Kyrgyzstan, 1954–), Turkic languages
 Curme, George Oliver, Sr. (United States, 1860–1948), German language, English language
 Curzan, Anne (United States), English language, Descriptivism, Prescriptivism, lexicography

D
 Dal, Vladimir (Russia, 1801–1872), lexicography, Russian language
 Dahl, Östen (Sweden, 1945–), tense and aspect in linguistic typology
 Darzi, Ali (Iran), generative syntax, minimalist program
 Das, Khudiram (India, 1916–2002), Bengali and Santali language
 Dani, Ahmad Hasan (Pakistan, 1920–2009), South Asian languages
 Daniels, Peter T. (United States), writing systems
 Dayal, Veneeta (United States), semantics, syntax
 Deacon, Terrence (United States), language change, origin of language, cognitive linguistics
 Dehkhoda, Ali-Akbar (Iran, 1879–1959), lexicography, Persian language
 Delbrück, Berthold (Germany, 1842–1922), Indo-European languages, syntax, comparative linguistics
 DeLancey, Scott (United States, 1949–), Tibeto-Burman languages, linguistic typology, historical linguistics
 Dempwolff, Otto (Germany, 1871–1938), Austronesian languages
 Mark de Vos (South Africa), syntax, Minimalist Program, psycholinguistics, West Germanic languages, Bantu languages
 Diderichsen, Paul (Denmark, 1905–1964), Danish
 Diffloth, Gérard (United States), Mon–Khmer languages
 van Dijk, Teun Adrianus (Netherlands, 1943–), pragmatics, discourse analysis, text linguistics
 Dik, Simon (the Netherlands, 1940–1995) Functional Grammar, theoretical linguistics
 Dixon, Robert Malcolm Ward (Australia, 1939–), syntax, typology, Australian languages, Amazonian languages
 Dobrovský, Josef (Czech Republic, 1753–1829), Slavic languages, Czech language, lexicography
 Dobson, Veronica Perrule (Australia, 1944–), Arrernte language
 Doke, Clement Martyn (South Africa, 1893–1980), Bantu languages, Lamba language
 Dolgopolsky, Aharon (Russia/Israel, 1930–2012), Nostratic languages
 Dorian, Nancy (United States), language death, Scottish Gaelic
 Dougherty, Ray C. (United States), transformational grammar, computational linguistics
 Dowty, David (United States), semantics, syntax
 Dozier, Edward P. (United States, 1916–1971), Native American languages, languages of the Philippines
 Dressler, Wolfgang U. (Austria, 1939–), phonology, morphology, text linguistics
 van Driem, George (Netherlands), Tibeto-Burman languages, symbiosism, Dzongkha language
 Dryer, Matthew (United States), typology, syntax, language documentation
 Duden, Konrad (Germany, 1829–1911), lexicography, German language
 Dunn, John Asher (United States,1939–2017), Tsimshian language

E
 Eckert, Penelope (United States), sociolinguistics, language and gender
 Edmondson, Jerold A. (United States), Tai–Kadai languages, languages of Southeast Asia
 Edwards, Jonathan, Jr. (United States, 1745–1801), North American languages, historical linguistics, Mohegan language
 Ehret, Christopher (United States), languages of Africa, historical linguistics
 Elbert, Samuel Hoyt (United States, 1907–1997), Polynesian languages of Hawaii and Rennell and Bellona, Puluwatese language
 Elgin, Suzette Haden (United States, 1936–2015), constructed languages, transformational grammar
 Ellis, Rod (UK), second-language acquisition
 Elman, Jeffrey L. (United States), language processing, neurolinguistics
 Emeneau, Murray Barnson (United States, 1904–2005), Dravidian languages, linguist areas
 Emre, Ahmet Cevat (Turkey, 1876–1961), Member of the Turkish Language Association, Turkish alphabet
 Engberg-Pedersen, Elisabeth (Denmark, 1952–), semantics, Danish Sign Language
 Erdal, Marcel (Turkey, 1945–), Turkic languages
 Esenç, Tevfik (Turkey 1904–1992), Ubykh language
 Evans, Nicholas (Australia, 1956–), Indigenous Australian languages, Papuan languages, typology
 Evans, Vyvyan (UK, 1968–), cognitive linguistics, digital communication, and emoji
 Even-Shoshan, Avraham (Belarus/Israel, 1906–1984), Hebrew language, lexicography
 Everett, Daniel Leonard (United States, 1951–), languages of Brazil, Pirahã language
 Everson, Michael (United States/Ireland, 1963–), writing systems, historical linguistics

F
 Fairuzabadi
 Fierz-David, Linda (Germany, 1891–1955), philology
 Fillmore, Charles J. (United States, 1929–2014), syntax, lexical semantics, cognitive linguistics, lexicography
 Firth, John Rupert (UK, 1890–1960), phonetics, phonology, prosody
 Fischer-Jørgensen, Eli (Denmark 1911–2010), phonetics, phonology, Danish language
 Fishman, Joshua (United States, 1926–2015), sociology of language
 Fiske, Willard (United States, 1831–1904), Northern European languages, Icelandic language
 Fodor, Janet Dean (United States), psycholinguistics, semantics, syntax
 Fodor, Jerry Alan (United States, 1935–2017), psycholinguistics, language of thought
 Foley, William A. (Australia, 1949–), Papuan languages, Austronesian languages
 Ford, Jeremiah Denis Mathias (United States, 1873–1958), Spanish language
 Fowler, Carol A. (United States), phonetics, phonology
 François, Alexandre (France), Austronesian languages, historical linguistics, language contact
 Freiman, Aleksandr Arnoldovich (Poland/Russia, 1879–1968), Iranian languages
 French, David Heath (United States, 1918–1994), Native American languages
 Friedrich, Johannes (Germany, 1893–1972), Hittite language
 Fromkin, Victoria (United States, 1923–2000), theoretical linguistics, constructed languages
 Fujitani Nariakira (Japan, 1738–1779), Japanese language

G
 Galloway, Brent D. (United States, 1944–2014), Amerindian languages, Halkomelem language
 Gamkrelidze, Thomas V. (Georgia, 1929–2021), Indo-European studies, Georgian language
 Gans, Eric (United States, 1941–), origin of language
 Garnier, Romain (France), Indo-European linguistics
 Gazdar, Gerald (UK, 1950–), computational linguistics, syntax, semantics
 Gebauer, Jan (Czech Republic, 1838–1907), Czech language
 Geeraerts, Dirk (Belgium, 1955–), semantics, lexicography
 van Geert, Paul (Netherlands), second language development
 Giles, Howard, sociolinguistics
 Givón, Talmy (Israel/United States, 1936–), syntax, semantics, pragmatics, typology, functionalism
 Giegerich, Heinz (Germany/UK), English language, phonology
 Gleason, Jean Berko (United States), psycholinguistics, language acquisition
 Goatly, Andrew (UK), English language, Chinese language
 Goddard, Cliff (Australia), semantics, pragmatics
 Goddard, R.H. Ives, III (United States), Algonquian languages, historical linguistics
 Gode, Alexander (Germany/United States, 1906–1970), constructed languages, Germanic languages
 Goldberg, Adele (United States, 1963–), syntax, psycholinguistics
 Goldsmith, John Anton (United States, 1951–), phonology, computational linguistics
 Goldstein, Louis M. (United States), phonetics, phonology
 Gong Hwang-cherng (Republic of China, 1934–2010), Sino-Tibetan languages, Old Chinese, Tangut language
 Gordon, Cyrus Herzl (United States, 1908–2001), ancient languages, cuneiform script
 Gramsci, Antonio (Italy), Italian language
 Gray, Louis Herbert (United States, 1875–1955), Indo-Iranian languages, phonology
 Green, Lisa (United States), syntax of African American English
 Greenberg, Joseph Harold (United States, 1915–2001), typology, language universals, languages of Africa
 Grice, (Herbert) Paul (UK/United States, 1913–1988), pragmatics
 Grierson, George Abraham (Ireland, 1851–1941), languages of India
 Gries, Stefan Th. (Germany/United States, 1970–), corpus linguistics, computational linguistics, cognitive linguistics, construction grammar
 Grimm, Jakob Ludwig Carl (Germany, 1785–1863), historical linguistics, comparative linguistics, German language
 Grinder, John Thomas (United States, 1940–), neurolinguistics
 Grosz, Barbara J. (United States), natural language processing, computational modeling of discourse
 Groupe µ (Belgium, 1967–), rhetorics, semiotics
 Grube, Wilhelm (Germany, 1855–1908), Tungusic languages, Nivkh language, Jurchen language
 Grønnum, Nina (Denmark, 1945–), intonation of Danish
 Gumperz, John Joseph (United States, 1922–2013), sociolinguistics, discourse analysis, linguistic anthropology
 Gutiérrez Eskildsen, Rosario María (Mexico, 1899–1979), Spanish language, dialectology
 Guy, Gregory (United States), sociolinguistics, historical linguistics, phonetics, phonology
 Guthrie, Malcolm (Britain, 1903–1972), Bantu languages

H
 Haarmann, Harald (Germany, 1946–), evolutionary linguistics, language contact
 Haas, Mary Rosamund (United States, 1910–1996), Native American languages, Thai language, historical linguistics
 Haase, Martin (Germany, 1962–), Romance languages
 Hagberg, Carl August (Sweden, 1810–1864), Scandinavian languages
 Hajič, Jan (Czech Republic), computational linguistics
 Hajičová, Eva (Czech Republic, 1935–), corpus linguistics
 Hale, Kenneth Locke (United States, 1934–2001), syntax, phonology
 Hall, Kira (United States), sociocultural linguistics
 Hall, Robert A., Jr. (United States, 1911–1997), Romance languages, Pidgins and Creoles
 Halle, Morris (Latvia/United States, 1923–2018), phonology, morphology
 Halliday, Michael Alexander Kirkwood (UK/Australia, 1925–2018), systemic functional grammar, ecolinguistics, applied linguistics
 Hammarström, Harald (Sweden, 1977–), computational linguistics, historical linguistics, linguistic typology
 Hammond, Michael (United States, 1957–), phonology, computational linguistics, syntax
 Hamp, Eric P. (United States, 1920–2019), Indo-European languages, Native American languages
 Hanzeli, Victor (United States, 1925–1991), Romance languages
 Haq, Mehr Abdul (Pakistan, 1915–1995), Saraiki language
 Harder, Peter (Denmark, 1950–), English language, functional linguistics
 Harkavy, Alexander (Belarus/United States, 1863–1939), Yiddish language, lexicography
 Harley, Heidi B. (United States, 1969–), distributed morphology, syntax
 Harrington, John Peabody (United States, 1884–1961), Native American languages, phonetics
 Harris, Roy (UK, 1931–2015), semiology, integrationism
 Harris, Zellig Sabbetai (Ukraine/United States, 1909–1992), structural linguistics, discourse analysis, Semitic languages
 Harrison, K. David (United States, 1966–), phonology, endangered languages, language extinction
 Hartmann, Reinhard Rudolf Karl (Austria/UK, 1938–), lexicography, contrastive linguistics
 Hasan, Ruqaiya (India/Australia, 1931–2015), systemic functional grammar, sociolinguistics, applied linguistics
 Hashimoto Mantarō (Japan, 1932–1987), Japanese language
 Hashimoto Shinkichi (Japan, 1882–1945), Old Japanese language, Japanese language
 Haspelmath, Martin (Germany, 1963–), typology, language change, language contact, Lezgian language
 Haugen, Einar Ingvald (United States, 1906–1994), sociolinguistics, Old Norse
 Hawkins, Bruce Wayne (United States), cognitive linguistics
 Hawkins, John A. (UK), psycholinguistics, historical linguistics
 Hayakawa, Samuel Ichiye (Canada/United States, 1906–1992), semantics
 Hayes, Bruce (United States, 1955–), phonology
 Hays, David Glenn (United States, 1928–1995), computational linguistics, machine translation, dependency grammar, corpus linguistics, natural language processing, cognitive science
 Heath, Jeffrey (United States, 1949–), historical linguistics, morphology, linguistic anthropology
 Heim, Irene Roswitha (Germany/United States), semantics
 Heine, Bernd (Germany, 1939–), languages of Africa, sociolinguistics, language contact
 Hepburn, James Curtis (United States, 1815–1911), Japanese language, lexicography
 Herbert, Robert Knox (United States, 1952–2007), phonology, languages of Africa, sociolinguistics
 Hetzron, Robert (Hungary/United States, 1937–1997), Afro-Asiatic languages
 Hewitt, John Napoleon Brinton (United States, 1859–1937), Iroquoian languages
 Hjelmslev, Louis (Denmark, 1899–1965), comparative linguistics, semantics
 Hobbs, Jerry R. (United States, 1942–), computational linguistics, discourse analysis, syntax, semantics
 Hock, Hans Henrich (Germany/United States), historical linguistics, comparative linguistics, Sanskrit
 Hoey, Michael (UK), lexical priming, textual interaction, corpus linguistics
 Hockett, Charles Francis (United States, 1916–2000), phonology, morphology
 Hoff, Erika (United States, 1951—), Psycholinguistics
 Hoffmann, John-Baptist (Germany, 1857–1928), Mundari language
 Hogg, Richard M. (UK, 1944–2007), phonology, historical linguistics
 Hoijer, Harry (United States, 1904–1976), Athabaskan languages, Tonkawa language
 Hopper, Paul (UK/United States), historical linguistics, emergent grammar
 Hornstein, Norbert (United States), syntax
 Hryhorchuk, Lidiia (Ukraine, 1926–2018), Ukrainian language
 Hrozný, Bedřich (Czech Republic, 1879–1952), Hittite language, ancient languages
 Huddleston, Rodney D. (UK/Australia), English language
 Hudson, Richard (UK, 1939–), syntax, word grammar, linguistics in education
 von Humboldt, Wilhelm (Germany, 1787–1835), Basque language
 Hunston, Susan (UK, 1953–), corpus linguistics, lexical semantics
 Hupel, August Wilhelm (Germany/Estonia, 1737–1819), Estonian language, lexicography
 Hurford, James R. (UK, United States, 1941–), phonetics, semantics, grammar, computational linguistics, evolutionary linguistics
 Husain Khan, Masud (India, 1919–2010), Urdu language, phonetics, stylistics, linguistic description
 Hyman, Larry M. (United States, 1947–), phonology, languages of Africa
 Hymes, Dell Hathaway (United States, 1927–2009), sociolinguistics, Kathlamet language

I
 Ibn Sidah
 Ibn Manzur
 Ibn Jinni
 Illich-Svitych, Vladislav Markovich (Ukraine/Russia, 1934–1966), comparative linguistics, Nostratic languages
 Ivanov, Aleksei Ivanovich (Russia, 1878–1937), Chinese language, Tangut language
 Ivanov, Vyacheslav Vsevolodovich (Russia, 1929–2017), Indo-European studies
 Ivić, Pavle (Serbia, 1924–1999), South Slavic languages, phonology, Serbo-Croatian language

J
 Jackendoff, Ray (United States, 1945–), syntax, lexical semantics
 Jackson, Abraham Valentine Williams (United States, 1862–1937), Indo-Iranian languages, Avestan language
 Jackson, Kenneth Hurlstone (UK, 1909–1991), Brythonic languages, Gaelic languages
 Jacobsen, Lis (1882–1961), Danish and Nordic languages
 Jacques, Guillaume (France), Old Chinese, Rgyalrongic languages, Tangut language
 Jagić, Vatroslav (Croatia, 1838–1923), Croatian language, Slavic languages
 Jakobson, Roman Osipovich (Russia/Czech Republic/United States, 1896–1982), structuralism, phonology
 Jarring, Gunnar (Sweden, 1907–2002), Turkic languages
 Jasanoff, Jay (United States, 1942–), Indo-European linguistics
 Jaszczolt, Katarzyna (UK), semantics, pragmatics, philosophy of language
 Jaunius, Kazimieras (Lithuania, 1848–1908), Lithuanian language, comparative linguistics
 Jendraschek, Gerd (Germany), Basque language, Turkish language, Iatmul language
 Jensen, Eva Skafte (Denmark, 1966–), Danish language
 Jespersen, Otto (Denmark, 1860–1943), English language, phonetics, constructed languages
 Johnson, David E. (United States, 1946–), syntax
 Jones, Daniel (UK, 1881–1967), phonetics
 Jones, Sir William (UK, 1746–1794), Indo-European studies, Sanskrit, comparative linguistics
 Joshi, Aravind Krishana (India/United States, 1929–2017), computational linguistics
 Junast (PR China, 1934–2010), Mongolian language, Monguor language, Eastern Yugur language, Phags-pa script
 Jurafsky, Daniel (United States), computational linguistics

K
 Kaplan, Ronald M. (United States), computational linguistics
 Karadžić, Vuk Stefanović (Serbia, 1787–1864), Serbian language, lexicography
 Kari, James (United States), Native American languages
 Kasravi, Ahmad (Iran, 1890–1946), ancient languages, Iranian languages
 Katz, Jerrold J. (United States, 1932–2002), semantics, generative grammar
 Kaufman, Terrence (United States), historical linguistics, contact linguistics, Mesoamerican languages
 Kay, Martin (UK, United States), computational linguistics
 Kay, Paul (United States), construction grammar
 Kayne, Richard S. (United States), syntax, transformational grammar
 Kazama Kiyozō (Japan, 1928–), Japanese language
 Keating, Patricia (United States), phonetics
 Kellogg, Samuel H. (United States), Hindi language
 Kenyon, John Samuel (United States, 1874–1959), English language, lexicography, phonology
 Keyser, Samuel Jay (United States, 1935–), phonology, English language
 Kiesling, Scott Fabius (United States), sociolinguistics
 Kindaichi Haruhiko (Japan, 1913–2004), Japanese language
 Kindaichi Kyōsuke (Japan, 1882–1971), Ainu language
 Kinkade, M. Dale (United States, 1933–2004), Salishan languages
 Kiparsky, Paul (Finland/United States, 1941–), phonology, morphology
 Kirby, Simon (UK), computational linguistics, evolutionary linguistics
 Klima, Edward (United States, 1931–2008), sign language
 Klinkenberg, Jean-Marie (Belgium, 1944–), rhetorics, semiotics, stylistics
 Kloekhorst, Alwin (Netherlands, 1978–), Anatolian languages
 Knechtges, David R. (United States), East Asian languages, Chinese language
 Knorozov, Yuri Valentinovich (Russia, 1922–1999), Maya hieroglyphics, writing systems
 Kober, Alice (UK/United States, 1906–1950), Linear B
 Komárek, Miroslav (Czechia, 1924–2013), Czech language, morphology, phonology
 Kordić, Snježana (Croatia, 1964–), Serbo-Croatian language, syntax, sociolinguistics
 Kornai András (Hungary/United States, 1957–), mathematical linguistics, phonology, morphology, Hungarian language, syntax
 Kornfilt, Jaklin, theoretical linguistics, syntax, morphology, Turkic languages, Germanic languages
 Korsakov, Andrey Konstantinovich (Russia/Ukraine, 1916–2007), Germanic languages, English language, morphology, syntax
 Korzybski, Alfred Habdank Skarbek (Poland/United States, 1879–1950), general semantics
 Koster, Jan (Netherlands, 1945–), generative grammar
 Krahe, Hans (Germany, 1898–1965), Indo-European languages, Illyrian language
 Krashen, Stephen (United States, 1941–), second-language acquisition
 Kratzer, Angelika (United States/Germany), semantics
 Krauss, Michael E. (United States, 1941–2019), Native American languages
 Krishnamurti, Bhadriraju (India, 1929–2012), Dravidian languages
 Kroeber, Alfred Louis (United States, 1876–1960), Native American languages
 Kučera, Henry (Czech Republic/United States, 1925–2010), computational linguistics
 Kuno Susumu (Japan/United States, 1933–), Dravidian languages, Japanese language, syntax
 Kurath, Hans (Austria/United States, 1891–1992), English language, lexicography, dialectology
 Kuroda Shigeyuki (Japan, 1934–2009), Japanese language
 Kuryłowicz, Jerzy (Poland, 1895–1978), Indo-European languages, syntax, morphology
 Kvergić, Hermann Feodor (Slovakia, 1895–sometime after 1948), Turkish language
 Kychanov, Evgenij Ivanovich (Russia, 1932–2013), Tangut language

L
 Labov, William (United States, 1927–), sociolinguistics, phonology, English language
 Lado, Robert (United States, 1915–1995), applied linguistics, contrastive analysis
 Ladefoged, Peter Nielsen (UK/United States, 1925–2006), phonetics, endangered languages
 Laird, Charlton (United States, 1901–1984), lexicography, English language
 Lakoff, George P. (United States, 1941–), cognitive linguistics, transformational grammar, generative semantics, syntax
 Lakoff, Robin Tolmach (United States, 1942–), sociolinguistics
 Lamb, Sydney MacDonald (United States, 1929–), stratificational grammar, Native American languages, historical linguistics, computational linguistics
 Lambdin, Thomas Oden (United States), Semitic languages, Egyptian language
 Lane, Harlan (United States, 1936–2019), speech, Deaf culture, sign language
 Langacker, Ronald W. (United States, 1942–), cognitive linguistics
 Langdon, Margaret (United States, d. 2005), Native American languages
 LaPolla, Randy J. (United States), morpho-syntax, Chinese, Qiang, Rawang
 Lasersohn, Peter (United States), semantics
 Lasnik, Howard (United States, 1945–), syntax
 Laycock, Donald (Australia, 1936–1988), languages of Papua New Guinea
 Lee, Joan H. (Canada, 1981–), text messaging
 Leech, Geoffrey (UK), applied linguistics, English language
 Lees, Robert (United States, 1922–1996), machine translation
 Lehiste, Ilse (United States, 1922–2010), phonetics, Estonian language, Serbo-Croatian, phonology
 Lehmann, Winfred P. (United States, 1916–2007), historical linguistics, Proto-Indo-European language
 Leonard, Robert A. (United States), Forensic linguistics 
 Lepsius, Karl Richard (Germany, 1810–1884), Egyptian language, Nubian languages, phonology
 Leslau, Wolf (Polish-born American, 1906–2006), Semitic languages, Languages of Ethiopia
 Leskien, August (Germany, 1840–1916), comparative linguistics, Baltic languages, Slavic languages
 Levin, Beth (United States, d. 1955), semantics
 Levinson, Stephen C. (UK/Netherlands), pragmatics
 Levstik, Fran (Slovenia, 1831–1881), Slovene language
 Li Fanwen (PR China, 1932–), Tangut language
 Li, Fang-Kuei (PR China/United States, 1902–1987), Mattole language, Tai languages, Old Chinese, Tibetan language
 Li, Paul Jen-kuei (Taiwan), Formosan languages, Austronesian languages, historical linguistics, lexicography
 Liberman, Alvin Meyer (United States, 1917–2000), speech perception, phonology
 Liberman, Anatoly (Russia/United States), etymology, Germanic languages
 Liberman, Mark (United States), phonetics, prosody
 Lieber, Rochelle (United States, 1954–), morphology, syntax, lexical semantics
 Lieberman, Philip (United States), phonetics, language evolution
 Lillo-Martin, Diane (United States), signed languages
 Lisker, Leigh (United States, 1918–2006), phonetics, Dravidian languages
 Local, John (UK, 1947–), phonetics, phonology, conversation analysis
 Lounsbury, Floyd Glenn (United States, 1914–1998), Native American languages, Mayan languages
 Lowman, Guy Sumner, Jr. (United States, 1909–1941), phonetics
 Ludlow, Peter (United States, 1957–), syntax, semantics
 Lukoff, Fred (United States, 1920–2000), Korean language, phonology
 Lunde, Ken (United States, 1965–), East Asian languages
 Lynch, John (Australia, 1946–2021), Austronesian languages, historical linguistics

M
 Maclovitch, Elliott (Canada), linguist, machine translation
 MacWhinney, Brian (United States, 1945–), language acquisition, second-language acquisition, corpus linguistics
 Maddieson, Ian (United States), phonetics
 Fray Francisco Maldonado (1571 – c. 1640), Guatemalan Franciscan linguist and historian
 Manzini, Rita (Italy), generative syntax, Romance languages
 Malkiel, Yakov (United States, 1914–1998), etymology, philology
 Manaster Ramer, Alexis (United States/Poland), phonology, syntax, poetics, etymology
 Marantz, Alec (United States), distributed morphology
 March, Francis Andrew (United States, 1825–1911), comparative linguistics, lexicography, Old English language, English language
 Margolis, Max Leopold (Lithuania/United States, 1866–1932), Semitic languages
 Marr, Nikolay Yakovlevich (Georgia/Russia, 1865–1934), historical linguistics, comparative linguistics, origin of language
 Martin, James (Sydney, Australia), genre
 Martin, Samuel Elmo (United States, 1924–2009), Korean language, Japanese language
 Martinet, André (France, 1908–1999), structuralism, historical linguistics, constructed languages
 Martinet, Jeanne (France, 1920–2018), semiotics, constructed languages
 Massam, Diane (Canada), syntax, Austronesian languages
 Mathesius, Vilém (Czech Republic, 1882–1945), phonology, syntax, English language, Czech language
 Matisoff, James A. (United States, 1937–), Tibeto-Burman languages, phonology
 Matthews, Peter Hugoe (UK, 1934–), morphology, syntax
 Matthews, Stephen (UK/PR China), typology, syntax, semantics, Cantonese language
 Mattingly, Ignatius G. (United States, 1927–2004), phonetics, speech synthesis, speech perception
 Matveyev, Aleksandr (Russia, 1926–2010), onomastics, etymology
 McArthur, Tom (UK), English language, lexicography
 McCarthy, John J. (United States, 1953–), phonology, morphology, optimality theory
 McCawley, James D. (UK/United States, 1938–1999), syntax, semantics, phonology
 McCulloch, Gretchen (Canada), internet linguistics
 McCune, George McAfee (North Korea/United States, 1908–1988), Korean language
 McNamara, Barbara (United States), Chinese language
 McGregor, William B. (Australia, 1952–), Australian Aboriginal languages, theoretical linguistics, Shua language
 McWhorter, John Hamilton (United States, 1965–), creole languages, Saramaccan language
 Meillet, Antoine (France, 1866–1936), Comparative Linguistics, Armenian language, Philology
 Meinhof, Carl Friedrich Michael (Germany, 1857–1944), languages of Africa
 Melchert, H. Craig (United States), Anatolian languages
 Michaelis, Laura A. (United States), syntax, English language
 Michaud, Alexis (France), Phonetics, Tonology, Naish languages, Vietnamese
 Miklosich, Franz (Slovenia/Austria, 1813–1891), Slavic languages
 Miller, Wick R. (United States, 1932–1994), Keresan languages, Uto-Aztecan languages
 Miller, Roy Andrew (United States, 1924–2014), Tibetan language, Japanese language
 Mithun, Marianne (United States, 1946–), Native American languages
 Mitxelena Elissalt, Koldo (Spain, 1915–1987), Basque language
 Miura Tsutomu (Japan, 1911–1989), Japanese language
 Miyake, Marc (United States, 1971–), historical linguistics, Old Japanese, Tangut language
 Mönkh-Amgalan, Yümjiriin (Mongolia), pragmatics, semantics, syntax, Mongolian language, dialectology
 Mori Hiromichi (Japan, 1949–), Japanese language
 Moskvin, Anatoly (Russia), academic and linguist, arrested in 2011 after the bodies of 26 mummified young women were discovered in his home
 Motoori Norinaga (Japan, 1730–1801), Japanese language
 Motoori Haruniwa (Japan, 1763–1828), Japanese language
 Montague, Richard Merett (United States, 1930–1971), semantics, philosophy of language
 Moro, Andrea (Italy, 1962–), syntax, copula, expletive, antisymmetry, neurolinguistics
 Moser, Edward W. (United States), Seri language
 Mufwene, Salikoko (United States), creole languages, African-American English, language evolution
 Munro, Pamela (United States), Native American languages, lexicography
 Murayama Shichirō (Japan, 1908–1995), Japanese language
 Murray, James (UK, 1837–1915), lexicography, English language, etymology
 Muti’I, Ibrahim (China, 1920–2010), Uyghur language
 Myers-Scotton, Carol (United States, 1934–), language contact

N
 Nábělková, Mira (Slovakia), lexical semantics, sociolinguistics
 Nádasdy Ádám (Hungary), phonology, morphophonology
 Napoli, Donna Jo (United States, 1948–), syntax, phonetics, phonology, Japanese language
 Neeleman, Ad (Netherlands/UK, 1964–), syntax, semantics, phonology, generative grammar
 Nelson, Andrew Nathaniel (United States, 1893–1975), Japanese language, lexicography
 Nevsky, Nikolai Aleksandrovich (Russia, 1892–1937), Tangut language
 Newmeyer, Frederick J. (United States, 1944–), syntax, origin of language
 Nichols, Johanna (United States), languages of the Caucasus, Chechen language, Ingush language, typology
 Niftawayh (Iraq)
 Nishida Tatsuo (Japan, 1928–2012), Tangut language
 Nolan, Francis (UK), phonetics
 Noreen, Adolf Gotthard (Sweden, 1854–1925), dialectology, historical linguistics, Germanic languages
 Nunberg, Geoffrey (United States), lexical semantics, English language

O
 Odden, David A. (United States), phonology, African linguistics, Bantu languages
 Ohala, John (United States), phonetics, phonology
 Okrand, Marc (United States, 1948–), Klingon language, Mutsun language
 Ōno Susumu (Japan, 1919–2008), Japanese language, Tamil language
 Orešnik, Janez (Slovenia, 1935–), comparative linguistics
 Orikuchi Shinobu (Japan, 1887–1953), Japanese language
 Orton, Harold (UK, 1898–1975), phonology, dialectology, English dialects
 Osthoff, Hermann (Germany, 1847–1909), Indo-European studies, historical linguistics
 Ōtsuki Fumihiko (Japan, 1847–1928), Japanese language
 Özyürek, Aslı, psycholinguistics, neurolinguistics

P
 Pāṇini (India, ca. 520–460 BC), Sanskrit, morphology, descriptive linguistics, generative linguistics     
 Frank R. Palmer (England, 1922–2019), semantics, English language, Ethiopian languages
 Partee, Barbara Hall (United States, 1940–), semantics
 Paul, Hermann Otto Theodor (Germany, 1846–1921), lexicography, German language
 Pawley, Andrew Kenneth (Australia/New Zealand, 1941), Austronesian languages, Papuan languages, lexicography, phraseology
 Peacock, Dmitri Rudolf (Britain, 1842–1892), Kartvelian languages
 Pedersen, Holger (Denmark, 1867–1953), Celtic languages, historical linguistics, Nostratic languages
 Pedersen, Johannes (Denmark, 1883–1977), Hebrew language
 Pei, Mario Andrew (Italy/United States, 1901–1978), Italian language, Indo-European languages
 Pesetsky, David Michael (United States, 1957–), transformational grammar
 Keith Malcolm Petyt (UK), sociolinguistics
 Phillipson, Robert (UK/Denmark, 1942–), language policy
 Pierrehumbert, Janet (United States), phonetics, phonology
 Piller, Ingrid (Australia, 1967–), applied linguistics, sociolinguistics, intercultural communication
 Pinault, Georges-Jean (France), Tokharian, Indo-European linguistics
 Pike, Kenneth Lee (United States, 1912–2000), English language, constructed languages, tagmemics
 Pilch, Herbert (Germany, 1927–2018), Old English, Celtic languages, phonetics
 Pimsleur, Paul (United States), language acquisition, French language, phonetics
 Pinker, Steven (Canada/United States, 1954–), language acquisition, syntax, semantics
 Piron, Claude (Switzerland, 1931–2008), Esperanto, psycholinguistics
 Polinsky, Maria (United States), syntax, Austronesian languages
 Pollard, Carl Jesse (United States, 1947–), syntax, semantics
 Pollock, Jean-Yves (France), syntax
 Poplack, Shana (United States), sociolinguistics
 Poppe, Nicholas (Russia, 1897–1991), Mongolic languages
 Postal, Paul M. (United States, 1936–), syntax, semantics        
 Primer, Sylvester (United States, 1842–1912), English language, dialectology, phonetics, Germanic languages
 Prince, Alan Sanford (United States, 1946–), optimality theory, phonology
 Prince, Ellen (United States, 1944–2010), pragmatics
 Pulgram, Ernst (Austria/United States, 1915–2005), Romance languages, Italic languages
 Pullum, Geoffrey K. (UK/United States, 1945–), syntax, English language
 Pustejovsky, James D. (United States), natural language processing, computational linguistics, semantics

Q
 Quirk, Charles Randolph (UK/Germany, 1920–2017), English language

R
 Radford, Andrew (UK, 1945–), syntax, generative grammar, child language acquisition
 Rael, Juan Bautista (United States, 1900–1993), phonology, morphology, New Mexican Spanish
 Rask, Rasmus Christian (Denmark, 1787–1832), lexicography, comparative linguistics, Indo-European language
 Ratliff, Martha (United States), Hmong–Mien languages, historical linguistics
 Rauch, Irmengard (United States), Germanic languages, semiotics
 Read, Allen Walker (United States, 1906–2002), etymology, lexicography, English language
 Reinhart, Tanya (Israel, 1943–2007), syntax
 Rice, Keren (Canada), phonology, morphology, Athapaskan languages
 Rickford, John Russell (United States), sociolinguistics, African-American English
 van Riemsdijk, Henk (Netherlands, 1948–), prepositional phrases, free relatives, syntax, Germanic language
 Rizzi, Luigi (Italy, 1952–), syntax, language acquisition
 Roberts, Ian G. (UK, 1957–), syntax
 Rock, Joseph Francis Charles (Austria/United States/PR China, 1884–1962), Naxi language, lexicography
 Rosenblat, Ángel (Poland/Venezuela, 1902–1984), lexicography, Venezuelan Spanish, Philology
 Ross, John Robert (United States, 1938–), semantics, syntax
 Ross, Malcolm David (Australia, 1942–), Austronesian languages, Papuan languages, historical linguistics, language contact
 Rubach, Jerzy (Poland/United States, 1948–), phonology, Polish language
 Rubin, Philip E. (United States, 1949–), articulatory synthesis, phonology
 Ruhlen, Merritt (United States), typology, historical linguistics

S
 Sacks, Harvey (United States, 1935–1975), conversation analysis
 Sadock, Jerrold (United States), syntax, morphology, pragmatics, Greenlandic language, Yiddish language
 Sag, Ivan (United States, 1949–2013), syntax, construction grammar
 Sagart, Laurent (France), Chinese linguistics and Austronesian languages
 Sakaguchi, Alicja (Poland/Germany, 1954–), interlinguistics, Esperanto
 Shakirova, Liya (Soviet Union/Russia, 1921–2015), Russian language
 Salo, David (United States, 1969–), constructed languages, Tocharian languages, Elvish languages
 Sampson, Geoffrey (UK, 1944–), philosophy of language
 Sánchez Carrión, José María (Spain, 1952–), Basque language, sociolinguistics, historical linguistics
 Sankoff, Gillian (Canada), sociolinguistics
 Sankrityayan, Rahul (India, 1893–1963), Tibetan language, Hindi language
 Sapir, Edward (Germany/United States, 1884–1939), Native American languages, constructed languages, semantics
 Sarkar, Prabhat Ranjan (India, 1921–1990), Transliteration, Science of Letters         
 Saunders, Irene (United States/PR China), lexicography, Chinese language
 de Saussure, Ferdinand (Switzerland/France, 1857–1913), semantics, Indo-European studies, structural linguistics
 Sayce, Archibald Henry (UK, 1846–1933), Akkadian language
 Schegloff, Emanuel (United States), conversation analysis
 Schleicher, August (Germany, 1821–1868), Indo-European studies, language development, historical linguistics
 Schmidt, Johannes (Germany, 1843–1901), historical linguistics, Indo-European studies
 Schmidt, Richard (United States, 1941–2017), second-language acquisition
 Schmidt, Wilhelm (Germany/Austria/Switzerland, 1868–1954), Mon–Khmer languages
 Searle, John Rogers (United States, 1932–), philosophy of language, pragmatics
 Selinker, Larry (United States), second-language acquisition
 Sen, Sukumar (India, 1900–1992), Bengali language
 Sequoyah (United States, 1767–1843), Cherokee language
 Setälä, Eemil Nestor (Finland, 1864–1935), Finnish language, Uralic languages
 Sgall, Petr (Czech Republic, 1926–2019), syntax
 Shackle, Christopher (UK, 1942–), Urdu language, Saraiki language
 Shepard-Kegl, Judy (United States), Nicaraguan Sign Language
 Shevoroshkin, Vitaly Victorovich (Russia/United States), Slavic languages, Nostratics
 Shinmura Izuru (Japan, 1876–1967), Japanese language
 Sibawayh (Iran, ca. 760–796), Arabic language
 Sidi Boushaki (Algeria, ca. 796–857), Arabic language
 Sievers, Eduard (Germany, 1850–1932), Germanic languages, historical linguistics
 Siewierska, Anna (Poland/Netherlands/UK, 1955–2011), language typology
 Sihler, Andrew Littleton (United States, 1941), comparative linguistics, Indo-European languages
 Sinclair, John McHardy (UK, 1933–2007), applied linguistics, corpus linguistics, discourse analysis
 Skeat, Walter W. (UK, 1835–1912), Old English, Middle English, etymology, philology
 Skinner, B.F. (United States, 1905–1992), verbal behavior
 Skousen, Royal (United States, 1945–), language modeling
 Smith, Neilson Voyne (UK, 1939–), syntax, language acquisition
 Smolensky, Paul (United States, 1955–), phonology, optimality theory, syntax
 Stachowski, Marek (Poland), historical linguistics, Turkic languages
 Starostin, Georgiy Sergeevich (Russia, 1976–), comparative linguistics, historical linguistics, Nostratics, Proto-World
 Starostin, Sergei Anatolyevich (Russia, 1953–2005), comparative linguistics, historical linguistics, Nostratics, Proto-World
 Stati, Sorin (Romania-French, 1931–2008), pragmatics, syntax
 Steedman, Mark (UK, United States), theoretical linguistics, categorial grammar, syntax, computational linguistics
 Steels, Luc (Belgium), computational linguistics, evolutionary linguistics
 Stetson, Raymond Herbert (United States, d. 1950), phonetics
 Stieber, Zdzisław (Poland, 1903–1980), Slavic languages, phonology
 Stokoe, William (United States, 1919–2000), American Sign Language, cherology
 Stollznow, Karen (United States), lexical semantics, sociolinguistics, cognitive linguistics
 Suzuki Takao (Japan, 1926–2021), Japanese language, sociolinguistics
 Swadesh, Morris (United States, 1909–1967), typology, historical linguistics, Native American languages, lexicostatistics
 de Swart, Henriette (Netherlands), semantics
 Sweet, Henry (UK, 1845–1912), Germanic languages, phonetics
 Sweetser, Eve (United States), cognitive linguistics, semantics, historical linguistics, Celtic languages

T
 Talmy, Leonard (United States), cognitive linguistics, semantics, Yiddish language, Native American languages
 Tannen, Deborah Frances (United States, 1945–), discourse analysis
 Tarone, Elaine (United States), second-language acquisition
 Tarpent, Marie-Lucie (Canada), Tsimshianic languages
 Tha Myat (Burma), Mon language, Burmese language, Pyu language, Nagari
 Teeter, Karl van Duyn (United States, 1929–2007), Algic languages, endangered languages
 Thieberger, Nicholas (Australia), Indigenous Australian languages
 Thomas, Calvin (United States, 1854–1919), Germanic languages, German language
 Thomason, Sarah Grey (United States), language contact, historical linguistics, typology, Montana Salish
 Thompson, John Eric Sidney (UK, 1898–1975), Maya languages, Maya hieroglyphics
 Thompson, Sandra A. (United States), syntax, discourse analysis, Mandarin language
 Tokieda Motoki (Japan, 1900–1967), Japanese language
 Tolkien, John Ronal Reuel (UK, 1892–1973), Old English language, constructed languages, Sindarin, Quenya
 Toporišič, Jože (Slovenia, 1926–2014), Slovene language
 Trager, George Leonard (United States, 1906–1992), phonemics, paralanguage, semantics
 Trask, Robert Lawrence (United States, 1944–2004), Basque language, historical linguistics, origin of language
 Traugott, Elizabeth C. (United States), grammaticalization
 Trubetzkoy, Nikolai Sergeyevich (Russia/Austria, 1890–1938), structural linguistics, morphology, phonology
 Trudgill, Peter (UK, 1943–), sociolinguistics, English language, dialectology
 Tuite, Kevin (United States, 1954–), Caucasian languages, Georgian language
 Turner, Mark (United States), cognitive linguistics
 Tucker, Archibald (South Africa, 1904–1980), African languages

U
 Uldall, Elizabeth T. (United States, 1913–2004), phonetics
 Uldall, Hans Jørgen (Denmark, 1907–1957), glossematics, Maidu language 
 Ullendorff, Edward (UK, 1920–2011), Semitic languages
 Unger, James Marshall (United States, 1947–), Japanese language, historical linguistics, writing systems
 Upton, Clive (UK), English language, sociolinguistics, dialectology

V
 Vajda, Edward (United States), Ket language, historical linguistics, Na-Dené languages, comparative linguistics
 van Valin, Robert D. (United States, 1952–), syntax, semantics, cognitive linguistics
 Valli, Clayton (United States, d. 2003), American Sign Language,
 Vasmer, Max (Russia/Germany, 1886–1962), etymology, historical linguistics, Russian language
 Vaux, Bert (United States, 1968–), phonology, morphology, Armenian language
 Veltman, Calvin (United States/Canada/France), sociolinguistics
 Vendler, Zeno (United States, 1921–2004), philosophy of language, event structure
 Ventris, Michael George Francis (UK, 1922–1956), Linear B, Archaic Greek
 Verner, Karl (Denmark, 1846–1896), phonology, comparative linguistics, historical linguistics
 Vincent, Nigel (UK), morphology, syntax, historical linguistics
 Voloshinov, Valentin Nikolaevich (Russia, 1895–1936), semantics
 Vovin, Alexander (Russia/United States), Japanese language, Siberian languages, Korean language, Ainu language, Central Asian languages

W
 Wackernagel, Jacob (Switzerland, 1853–1938), Indo-European studies, Sanskrit
 Wang Li (PR China, 1900–1986), Chinese language
 Watanabe Shōichi (Japan, 1930–2017), Japanese language
 Watkins, Calvert (United States), comparative linguistics, Indo-European languages
 Weeks, Raymond (United States, 1863–1954), phonetics, French language
 Weinreich, Max (Latvia/United States, 1893–1969), Yiddish language
 Weinreich, Uriel (Poland/United States, 1926–1967), sociolinguistics, dialectology, semantics, Yiddish language
 Wells, John Christopher (UK, 1939–), phonetics, Esperanto
 Westermann, Diedrich Hermann (Germany, 1875–1956), languages of Africa, typology
 Westphal, Ernst Oswald Johannes (South Africa/UK, 1919–1990), Bantu languages, Khoisan languages
 Whalen, Douglas H. (United States), phonology, endangered languages
 Wheeler, Benjamin Ide (United States, 1854–1927), historical linguistics, comparative linguistics, Greek language
 White, Lydia (UK/Canada), second-language acquisition
 Whitney, William Dwight (United States, 1827–1894), lexicography, Sanskrit, English language
 Wilks, Yorick (UK, 1939–), artificial intelligence, computational linguistics, natural language processing, semantics
 Whorf, Benjamin Lee (United States, 1897–1941), Native American languages, Maya script, linguistic relativity
 Wichmann, Søren (Denmark, 1964–), Mesoamerican languages, Mixe–Zoque languages, Mayan languages, Maya script
 Widdowson, Henry G. (UK), English language, discourse analysis
 Wierzbicka, Anna (Poland/Australia, 1938–), semantics, pragmatics
 Wiese, Richard (Germany, 1953–), phonology, morphology, neurolinguistics
 Williams, Nicholas Jonathan Anselm (UK/Ireland, 1942–), Cornish language, Irish language, Manx language, phonology
 Williams, Samuel Wells (United States/China, 1812–1884), Chinese language, lexicography
 Wilson, Robert Dick (United States, 1856–1930), comparative linguistics, Hebrew language, Syriac language
 Wittmann, Henri (France/Canada, 1937–), French language, creole languages, morphology, comparative linguistics
 Wodak, Ruth (Austria/UK, 1950–), discourse analysis
 Wolvengrey, Arok (Canada), Cree language, syntax, Native American languages, lexicography
 Worcester, Samuel (1798–1859), Presbyterian missionary, linguist, co-founder of Cherokee Phoenix with Elias Boudinot (first Cherokee newspaper in Indian Territory)
 Wright, Alfred (United States, 1788–1853), Presbyterian minister, physician, linguist, Choctaw language
 Wurm, Stephen Adolphe (Hungary/Australia, 1922–2001), Australian Aboriginal languages, Papuan languages

Y
 Yeda Pessoa de Castro (Brazil), African languages
 Yamada Yoshio (Japan, 1873–1958), Japanese language
 Yiakoumetti, Androula (Cyprus), Greek language, dialectology
 Yngve, Victor (United States, 1920–2012), computational linguistics, natural language processing
 Young, Robert W. (United States, 1912–2007), Navajo language, lexicography

Z
 Zamenhof, Ludwik Łazarz (Poland, 1859–1917), Esperanto
 Zepeda, Ofelia (United States, 1952–), O'odham language
 Zhang, Niina Ning (PR China), formal syntax, morphology
 Zhou Youguang (PR China, 1906–2017), orthography, Romanization of Chinese
 Zuazo, Koldo (Spain, 1956–), Basque dialectology, sociolinguistics
 Zuckermann, Ghil'ad (Israel, Italy, UK, Australia, 1971–), contact linguistics, lexicology, revival linguistics
 Zwicky, Arnold (United States, 1940–), syntax, morphology

See also

 List of women linguists
 List of Russian linguists and philologists
 List of Jewish American linguists
 List of lexicographers

Notes

Linguistics lists

Linguists
Linguists
Linguists